The following television stations broadcast on digital or analog television channel 13 in Canada:

 CBCT-DT in Charlottetown, Prince Edward Island
 CBKFT-DT in Regina, Saskatchewan
 CFCN-DT-5 in Lethbridge, Alberta
 CFEM-DT in Rouyn-Noranda, Quebec
 CFRN-TV-1 in Grande Prairie, Alberta
 CFRN-TV-12 in Athabasca, Alberta
 CFRS-DT in Saguenay, Quebec
 CHAU-DT-5 in Percé, Quebec
 CHBC-TV-9 in Apex Mountain, British Columbia
 CHMI-DT in Winnipeg, Manitoba
 CHSH-TV-2 in Chase, British Columbia
 CICT-TV-2 in Banff, Alberta
 CIII-DT-13 in Timmins, Ontario
 CIMT-DT-2 in Trois-Pistoles, Quebec
 CIMT-DT-4 in Baie-Saint-Paul, Quebec
 CITM-TV-1 in Williams Lake, British Columbia
 CITV-DT in Edmonton, Alberta
 CJBN-TV in Kenora, Ontario
 CJCH-TV-4 in Bridgetown, Nova Scotia
 CJOH-DT in Ottawa, Ontario
 CKCA-TV in Chateh, Alberta
 CKCO-DT in Kitchener, Ontario
 CKPG-TV-5 in Quesnel, British Columbia
 CKRT-DT-3 in Rivière-du-Loup, Quebec
 CKYB-TV-1 in McCreary, Manitoba
 CKYF-TV in Flin Flon, Manitoba

13 TV stations in Canada